Cheryl Torrenueva is a Canadian designer, best known as a personality on television shows produced by HGTV Canada.

A graduate of Ryerson University, Torrenueva started in television as a contestant on Designer Superstar Challenge. Although she did not win, she was offered the opportunity to become a guest designer on Home to Go, and has since appeared on Rooms That Rock, Restaurant Makeover, Restaurant: Impossible and Colin and Justin's Home Heist.

References

External links
 Cheryl Torrenueva

Canadian interior designers
Canadian women television personalities
Canadian people of Filipino descent
Living people
Toronto Metropolitan University alumni
Participants in Canadian reality television series
Year of birth missing (living people)